Love & π is a 2018 Taiwanese television series created and produced by EBC. It stars Ivy Shao, Ben Wu, Daniel Chen and Candy Yang as the main cast. Filming began on 28 May 2018  and ended on 4 November 2018. It was first broadcast on 21 July 2018 on EBC and aired every Saturday night from 10pm to 11.30pm.

Synopsis
Zhao Wu Xian, Zhao Yuan Man, Hou Zi Cheng and Lin Mei Xin are good friends who grew up together in the same orphanage in Yun Lin. In year 2009, Wu Xian, Yuan Man and Zi Cheng went to Taipei to pursue their dreams. They will be facing some challenges on the way, how will they overcome it?

Yuan Man thinks of her relationship with Wu Xian as siblings whereas Wu Xian does not. He wants to protect Yuan Man forever and would like her to be his partner. However this journey of love is not smooth, and may even reach bottleneck. However, their “Love” will definitely follow the “Circle” (Yuan/π) and back on its path again.

Cast

Main cast
 Ivy Shao as Zhao Yuan-man
 Ben Wu as Zhao Wu-xian
 Daniel Chen as Hou Zi-cheng
 Candy Yang as Lin Mei-xin

Supporting cast
  Jenny Lee as Zhang Ruo-yun
  Blue Lan as Liang Yi-qing
  Kerr Hsu as Xu Shi-ming
  Wasir Chou as Bai Wei-guang
  Jian Chang as Dean Zhao (Dean of the orphanage)
  Andrew Liu as Zhang Hai-ping

Soundtrack

Broadcast

Ratings

Awards and nominations

References

External links
 Love & π TTV Official Website 
 Love & π EBC Official Website 
 
Love & π LineTV Official Website 
Love & π LineTV (New version) Official Website 

Taiwanese romance television series
Taiwanese drama television series
2018 Taiwanese television series debuts
2018 Taiwanese television series endings
Taiwan Television original programming